Phillip Criszam Jabar Paniamogan is a Filipino professional basketball player for the NLEX Road Warriors of the Philippine Basketball Association (PBA). Paniamogan played college basketball for Jose Rizal University. Paniamogan went undrafted in the 2014 PBA draft, but got the attention of the GlobalPort Batang Pier management by his solid show in a tournament organized by the team in General Santos before the concluding season started. He signed with GlobalPort in September 2015.

PBA career statistics

As of the end of 2022–23 season

Season-by-season averages

|-
| align=left rowspan=2| 
| align=left | GlobalPort
| rowspan=2|9 || rowspan=2|5.8 || rowspan=2|.231 || rowspan=2|.111 || rowspan=2|1.000 || rowspan=2|.9 || rowspan=2|.8 || rowspan=2|.2 || rowspan=2|.0 || rowspan=2|1.9
|-
| align=left | Mahindra
|-
| align=left | 
| align=left | Mahindra / Kia
| 33 || 16.3 || .379 || .313 || .725 || 1.8 || 1.4 || .5 || .0 || 6.5
|-
| align=left rowspan=2| 
| align=left | Kia
| rowspan=2|16 || rowspan=2|15.8 || rowspan=2|.400 || rowspan=2|.308 || rowspan=2|.765 || rowspan=2|1.6 || rowspan=2|1.6 || rowspan=2|1.0 || rowspan=2|.3 || rowspan=2|6.6
|-
| align=left | NLEX
|-
| align=left | 
| align=left | NLEX
| 35 || 18.3 || .438 || .408 || .870 || 2.7 || 2.3 || .6 || .1 || 7.5
|-
| align="left" | 
| align=left | NLEX
| 6 || 10.6 || .280 || .182 || – || 1.5 || 1.2 || .2 || .0|| 2.7
|-
| align="left" | 
| align=left | NLEX
| 26 || 13.7 || .310 || .287 || .750 || 1.5 || 1.0 || .7 || .1 || 4.5
|-
| align="left" | 
| align=left | NLEX
| 17 || 10.4 || .338 || .300 || 1.000 || 1.8 || 1.0 || .5 || .1 || 4.1
|-class=sortbottom
| align=center colspan=2 | Career
| 142 || 14.7 || .374 || .323 || .790 || 1.9 || 1.5 || .6 || .1 || 5.6

References

1991 births
Living people
Basketball players from Misamis Oriental
Terrafirma Dyip players
Filipino men's basketball players
Maharlika Pilipinas Basketball League players
JRU Heavy Bombers basketball players
NLEX Road Warriors players
NorthPort Batang Pier players
Shooting guards
Sportspeople from Cagayan de Oro
Point guards